Ivan Demyanenko (born April 23, 1989) is an Uzbek swimmer, who specialized in breaststroke events. He represented his nation Uzbekistan at the 2008 Summer Olympics, finishing in the top 60 of the men's 100 m breaststroke.

Demyanenko qualified for the men's 100 m breaststroke at the 2008 Summer Olympics in Beijing, by clearing a FINA B-standard time of 1:03.59 from the Belarus Swimming Championships in Minsk. He challenged seven other swimmers on the third heat, including three-time Olympians Malick Fall of Senegal and Alwin de Prins of Luxembourg. Demyanenko rounded out the field in last place by two thirds of a second (0.67) behind Barbados' Andrei Cross with a time of 1:05.14. Demyanenko failed to advance into the semifinals, as he placed fifty-sixth overall in the prelims.

References

External links
NBC Olympics Profile

1989 births
Living people
Uzbekistani male breaststroke swimmers
Olympic swimmers of Uzbekistan
Swimmers at the 2008 Summer Olympics
Sportspeople from Tashkent
21st-century Uzbekistani people